This is a list of singles that have peaked in the Top 10 of the Billboard Hot 100 during 1976.

Captain & Tennille scored three top ten hits during the year with "Lonely Night", "Shop Around", and "Muskrat Love", the most among all other artists.

Top-ten singles

1975 peaks

1977 peaks

See also
 1976 in music
 List of Hot 100 number-one singles of 1976 (U.S.)
 Billboard Year-End Hot 100 singles of 1976

References

General sources

Joel Whitburn Presents the Billboard Hot 100 Charts: The Seventies
Additional information obtained can be verified within Billboard's online archive services and print editions of the magazine.

1976
United States Hot 100 Top 10